Dianthus acicularis is a species of pink in the carnation family mostly found in the Urals region; eastern European Russia and western Siberia, with some occurrences in Kazakhstan, and Xinjiang in China. A diploid, its resistance to bacterial wilt of carnation and ease of cell line propagation in the laboratory make it useful for breeding ornamental carnations for the cut flower industry.

References

acicularis
Flora of East European Russia
Flora of West Siberia
Flora of Kazakhstan
Flora of Xinjiang
Plants described in 1842